The rites of the Holy Week in Ruvo di Puglia are the main event that takes place in the Apulian town. Folklore and sacred or profane traditions, typical of the ruvestine tradition, represent a great attraction for tourists from neighboring cities and the rest of Italy and Europe, and have been included by the I.D.E.A. among the events of the intangible heritage of Italy.

History

The Confraternities of Ruvo 
The proof of the existence of the first Ruvestines confraternities can be found in the polyptych, a Byzantine work signed Z. T., depicting the Madonna with Child and confreres, in which the inscription "Hoc opus fieri fec(e)runt, confratres san(c)ti Cleti, anno salut(i)s 1537" and preserved in the church of Purgatory, in the left aisle, the one dedicated to Saint Anacletus.

The birth of the ruvestine Confraternities dates back to the period of the counter-reformation and currently there are only four associations still active. As reported by the polyptych, the first confraternity of which we know is the Confraternity of Saint Anacletus, whose praying brothers are represented in the painting dressed in a white sack and hooded. In the same period, Ruvo saw the birth of the Confraternity of the Holy Name of Jesus in the former church of the Rosary, now of San Domenico, by the Dominican fathers.

References 

Holy Week
Ruvo di Puglia
Italian traditions